The Vanuatu Republican Party is a centrist political party in Vanuatu. 
At the last general elections, held on 22 January 2016, they won no seats and 1.75% of the vote. Its leader is Maxime Carlot Korman, who was previously a member of the Union of Moderate Parties and had served as Prime Minister of Vanuatu while a member of the UMP. Korman and the Republican Party were part of the coalition government led by Ham Lini's National United Party from 2004 to 2008, and Korman served in the cabinet as minister of lands.

Korman left the UMP in the late 1990s after his rival Serge Vohor won a leadership struggle. At the July 6, 2004 elections, the party won 4 of the 52 seats. At the 2008 elections, the Republicans gained 3 seats and became as strong as the UMP, which had been the dominant party in the French-speaking community. In the 2012 elections the Republican Party lost 2 seats, including Korman's. Nonetheless, the party participated in the government, with the party's only MP, Marcellino Pipite, serving as Tourism and Commerce Minister.

Following the 2016 election the party lost its parliamentary representation, and after not contesting the 2020 election it failed to gain it back in the 2022 one.

Election results

Parliament

Political parties in Vanuatu
Main